Barbara Frey (born 1941) is a German stage and film actress. She was married to the actor Mark Damon.

Selected filmography
  (1958)
  (1960)
 What Is Father Doing in Italy? (1961)
 Love at Twenty (1962)
 I Must Go to the City (1962)
 100 Horsemen (1964)
 Our Crazy Aunts in the South Seas (1964)
 Stranger in Sacramento (1965)
 Kommissar X – In den Klauen des goldenen Drachen (1966)
 Requiescant (1967)
  (1968, TV miniseries)

References

Bibliography
 Robert Von Dassanowsky. Austrian Cinema: A History. McFarland, 2005.

External links

1941 births
Living people
German film actresses
German stage actresses
Actresses from Berlin